Forest is an EP by Seirom, independently released on December 25, 2011.

Track listing

Personnel
Adapted from the Forest liner notes.
 Maurice de Jong (as Mories) – guitar, bass guitar, drums, piano, synthesizer, recording, cover art
 Aaron Martin – cello (1)

Release history

References

External links 
 
 Forest at Bandcamp

2011 EPs
Seirom albums